Türkəçi (also, Türkəci, Tyuri-Gadzhi, and Tyurkachi) is a village and municipality in the Ujar Rayon of Azerbaijan.  It has a population of 429.

References 

Populated places in Ujar District